Silvia 'Sissy' Raith (born 11 June 1960, Munich) is a former German footballer. From 2004 to 2008 she coached the women's team of Bayern Munich. Starting from 2009 to 2010 she coaches the men's team of TSV Eching. Since 2010 the head coach of Azerbaijan U-17 National women's football team. As a player she was capped 58 times for Germany, winning the UEFA Women's Championship in 1989 and 1991. She also score 4 goals for the national team. She also won 4 German championships and 6 cups, playing for Bayern Munich, FSV Frankfurt, TSV Siegen, and SG Praunheim (now 1.FFC Frankfurt). Sissy worked as a coach of the U-17 Women's team of Azerbaijan. She prepared the girl footballers to the 2012 FIFA U-17 Women's World Cup, which took place in Azerbaijan. Later on, Sissy went to coach FC Staad and Basel in Switzerland.

International goals

References 

1960 births
Living people
Women's association football midfielders
German women's footballers
Germany women's international footballers
FC Bayern Munich (women) players
FSV Frankfurt (women) players
UEFA Women's Championship-winning players
Footballers from Munich